Luke Milligan (born 6 August 1976) is a former tennis player from the United Kingdom, who turned professional in 1995.

The right-hander reached his highest individual ranking on the ATP Tour on 8 July 1996, when he became the world number 217 just after he had won through to the third round of the Wimbledon tournament.
Also in 1996 he represented  Great Britain in the Davis cup in an away tie vs Ghana, winning 2 singles matches.

Turning to coaching in 2003, Luke has coached several top British players including Laura Robson Arvind Parmar and Anne Keothavong.

References

External links

1976 births
Living people
English male tennis players
People from Chipping Barnet
British male tennis players
Tennis people from Greater London